Nazzareno Canuti (born 15 January 1956 in Bozzolo) is a retired Italian professional footballer who played as a defender.

Honours
Inter
 Serie A champion: 1979–80.

References

1956 births
Living people
Italian footballers
Serie A players
Serie B players
Inter Milan players
A.C. Milan players
Genoa C.F.C. players
Catania S.S.D. players
A.S.D. SolbiaSommese Calcio players

Association football defenders